In coding theory, a polynomial code is a type of linear code whose set of valid code words consists of those polynomials (usually of some fixed length) that are divisible by a given fixed polynomial (of shorter length, called the generator polynomial).

Definition 

Fix a finite field , whose elements we call symbols. For the purposes of constructing polynomial codes, we identify a string of  symbols  with the polynomial

Fix integers  and let  be some fixed polynomial of degree , called the generator polynomial.

Example 

This code consists of the following code words:

Or written explicitly:

Since the polynomial code is defined over the Binary Galois Field , polynomial elements are represented as a modulo-2 sum and the final polynomials are:

Equivalently, expressed as strings of binary digits, the codewords are:

This, as every polynomial code, is indeed a linear code, i.e., linear combinations of code words are again code words. In a case like this where the field is GF(2), linear combinations are found by taking the XOR of the codewords expressed in binary form (e.g. 00111 XOR 10010 = 10101).

Encoding 

there will be exactly  code words. Since there are  such quotients available, there are the same number of possible code words.
Plain (unencoded) data words should therefore be of length 

Some authors, such as (Lidl & Pilz, 1999), only discuss the mapping  as the assignment from data words to code words. However, this has the disadvantage that the data word does not appear as part of the code word. 

To calculate it, compute the remainder of dividing  by :

The code word corresponding to the data word  is then defined to be

Note the following properties:
In particular,  is a valid code word.
In other words, the first  symbols of the code word are the same as the original data word. The remaining  symbols are called checksum digits or check bits.

Example 

 000  00000
 001  00111
 010  01001
 011  01110
 100  10010
 101  10101
 110  11011
 111  11100

Decoding 

An erroneous message can be detected in a straightforward way through polynomial division by the generator polynomial resulting in a non-zero remainder.

Assuming that the code word is free of errors, a systematic code can be decoded simply by stripping away the  checksum digits. 

If there are errors, then error correction should be performed before decoding. Efficient decoding algorithms exist for specific polynomial codes, such as BCH codes.

Properties of polynomial codes  

As for all digital codes, the error detection and correction abilities of polynomial codes are determined by the minimum Hamming distance of the code. Since polynomial codes are linear codes, the minimum Hamming distance is equal to the minimum weight of any non-zero codeword. In the example above, the minimum Hamming distance is 2, since 01001 is a codeword, and there is no nonzero codeword with only one bit set.

More specific properties of a polynomial code often depend on particular algebraic properties of its generator polynomial. Here are some examples of such properties:

 A polynomial code is cyclic if and only if the generator polynomial divides .
 If the generator polynomial is primitive, then the resulting code has Hamming distance at least 3, provided that .
 In BCH codes, the generator polynomial is chosen to have specific roots in an extension field, in a way that achieves high Hamming distance.

The algebraic nature of polynomial codes, with cleverly chosen generator polynomials, can also often be exploited to find efficient error correction algorithms. This is the case for BCH codes.

Specific families of polynomial codes 

 Cyclic codes – every cyclic code is also a polynomial code; a popular example is the CRC code.
 BCH codes – a family of cyclic codes with high Hamming distance and efficient algebraic error correction algorithms.
 Reed–Solomon codes – an important subset of BCH codes with particularly efficient structure.

References 
 W.J. Gilbert and W.K. Nicholson: Modern Algebra with Applications, 2nd edition, Wiley, 2004.
 R. Lidl and G. Pilz. Applied Abstract Algebra, 2nd edition. Wiley, 1999.

Coding theory